The Ovile (Latin, "sheep fold") was an enclosed area of the Campus Martius in Ancient Rome, used for voting. The name came from its resemblance to sheep pens. It was sometimes referred to as the Saepta (Latin, "enclosure"). It was a wooden structure and was replaced by the larger and more ornate marble Saepta Julia after the civil wars of 49–30 BC. This later building, commissioned by Julius Caesar, was possibly sited in the same area as the original Ovile.

References
Samuel Ball Platner, A Topographical Dictionary of Ancient Rome, London: Oxford University Press, 1929.
 
Ancient Roman buildings and structures in Rome
Roman archaeology